Yelena Ospivovna Avdeyeva (Russian: Елена Осиповна Авдеева; born on 19 July 1968), is a Russian politician who is currently serving as a Member of the Federation Council - representative of the executive authority of the Vologda Oblast since 19 September 2019.

She served as the Mayor of Cherepovets from 2017 to 2019.

Biography

Yelena Avdeyeva was born in Cherepovets on 19 July 1968.

Since 1987, she worked in the tax inspectorate of the Cherepovets region, holding the position of deputy head of the department of taxation of citizens by 1997.

In 1992, she graduated from St. Petersburg State University of Economics and Finance.

From 1997 to 1999, she was Deputy Head of the Department of Personal Income Taxation of the State Tax Inspectorate for the city of Cherepovets, then until 2005 - Deputy Head of the Inspectorate of the Federal Tax Service of Russia for Cherepovets.

In 2005, she was appointed Deputy General Director of LLC "Central Consulting Service for Taxes of the Vologda Region" by Mayor of Cherepovets Yury Kuzin. From 2006 to 2012, she headed the department of urban economy and trade in Cherepovets, when Oleg Kuvshinnikov was the mayor of the city at that time. Then until 2017 she oversaw social questions in the position of Deputy Mayor of Cherepovets, Kuzin.

On 14 September 2017, Avdeyeva was appointed mayor of Cherepovets, as she passed a competitive selection to fill the vacancy of a city manager.

On 19 September 2019, re-elected governor of the Vologda Oblast, Kuvshinnikov, endowed her with the powers of the representative of the executive body of state power of the Vologda Oblast in the Federation Council.

References

1968 births
Living people
United Russia politicians
Members of the Federation Council of Russia (after 2000)